Oh Min-ae is a South Korean actress. She is known for her roles in dramas such as Mr. Sunshine, My Liberation Notes, The Penthouse: War in Life and Blind. She also appeared in movies The Running Actress, Memento Mori, One Line, The Outlaws and Race to Freedom: Um Bok Dong.

Filmography

Television series

Film

Awards and nominations

References

External links 
 
 

1965 births
20th-century South Korean actresses
Living people
21st-century South Korean actresses
South Korean television actresses
South Korean film actresses